Kargapolsky District is an administrative and municipal district (raion), one of the twenty-four in Kurgan Oblast, Russia. It is located in the center of the oblast. Its administrative center is the urban locality (an urban-type settlement) of Kargapolye. Population:  34,854 (2002 Census);  The population of Kargapolye accounts for 26.5% of the district's total population.

References

Notes

Sources

Districts of Kurgan Oblast